Opposites Attract (working title Running Mates) is a 1990 American made-for-television romantic comedy film starring Barbara Eden and John Forsythe. It originally aired as the NBC Wednesday Night Movie on NBC on October 17, 1990.

Synopsis
A former cowboy movie star Rex Roper (John Forsythe) decides to run for Mayor of Crescent Bay, California. He hopes that if he wins the election, he will be able to install his hot tub, a plan that Town Supervisor Charlene McKeon (Barbara Eden) had previously nixed due to the area's water shortage.

Charlene is also running for Mayor, pitting her solid reputation, vigilant community membership and homespun values against Rex's popularity, megabucks and media savvy. Before the election, Rex and Charlene have created their own political scandal when the two opponents find themselves falling in love.

Cast
 Barbara Eden as Charlene "Charlie" McKeon
 John Forsythe as Rex Roper
 Ilene Graff as Frannie
 Conchata Ferrell as Flo
 Rebeca Arthur as Victoria
 Danielle von Zerneck as Sky
 Charles Levin as Marcino

Home media
Opposites Attract was released on Region 1 DVD on September 26, 2006 by Direct Source Label.

External links

1990 films
1990 television films
1990 romantic comedy films
1990s political comedy films
American political comedy films
American romantic comedy films
Films scored by Mark Snow
Films about actors
Films about elections
Films set in California
NBC network original films
1990s English-language films
Films directed by Noel Nosseck
1990s American films